Bakhodur Usmonov (born 21 December 1997) is a Tajikistani boxer. He competed in the men's lightweight event at the 2020 Summer Olympics.

References

External links
 
 

1997 births
Living people
Tajikistani male boxers
Olympic boxers of Tajikistan
Boxers at the 2020 Summer Olympics
Sportspeople from Dushanbe